"Takes a Little Time" was a maxi-single released in 1997 (see 1997 in music) to promote Amy Grant's album Behind the Eyes, which was also released that year. "Takes a Little Time" included two songs from Behind the Eyes, as well as a new version of Grant's 1982 Christian radio hit, "El Shaddai". The maxi-single was also an enhanced CD (ECD); a video could be viewed when inserted into a home computer.  The ECD portion of the CD contained a live acoustic version of the song After the Fire, which Grant later released on her 2003 album Simple Things; Grant stated on Oprah that she had written the song for her mother.

Track listing

 "Takes a Little Time" (Grant, Kirkpatrick) - 4:33
 "Somewhere Down the Road" (Grant, Kirkpatrick) - 5:09
 "El Shaddai '97" (Card, Thompson) - 4:10

 Bonus multimedia track - 39:14

Personnel 
 Amy Grant – lead vocals 
 Keith Thomas – keyboards, electric guitar 
 Kenny Greenberg – electric guitar 
 Gordon Kennedy – acoustic guitar, electric guitar 
 Tommy Sims – bass 
 Chad Cromwell – drums 
 Mark Hammond – additional drum programming 
 Terry McMillan – percussion, harmonica
 Lisa Cochran – backing vocals 
 Tabitha Fair – backing vocals

Chart positions

Weekly charts

Year-end charts

References

Amy Grant songs
1997 singles
Songs written by Wayne Kirkpatrick
Songs written by Amy Grant
1997 songs
Word Records singles
Song recordings produced by Keith Thomas (record producer)